Fotios "Fotis" Malelis   (Greek: Φώτιος "Φώτης" Μαλέλης; born June 25, 1997) is a Greek professional basketball player for Psychiko of the Greek A2 Basket League. He is a 2.05 m tall power forward.

High school
Malelis played high school basketball at the Arlington Country Day School, in Jacksonville, Florida.

College career
Malelis played college basketball in the National Association of Intercollegiate Athletics, with the St. Thomas University, from 2016 to 2019.

Professional career
After going undrafted at the 2019 NBA Draft Malelis joined Panionios of the Greek Basket League. On September 8, 2020, Malelis joined Dafni Dafniou of the Greek A2 League.

References

External links
Eurobasket.com Profile
RealGM.com Profile
Greek Basket League Profile 
Proballers Profile
STU College Bio
Twitter

1997 births
Living people
Greek men's basketball players
Greek expatriate basketball people in the United States
Panionios B.C. players
Psychiko B.C. players
Power forwards (basketball)
St. Thomas Bobcats men's basketball players
Basketball players from Athens